Shihhi may refer to:

Shihhi Arabic
Al-Shehhi, sometimes spelled Shihhi